The Sierra Madre Formation is a geologic formation in Chiapas state, southern Mexico. It consists of marine dolomites and limestones. The formation dates to the Middle Cretaceous, spanning from the Aptian of the Early to the Cenomanian of the Late Cretaceous.

The dolomites, dolomitic breccias and limestones of the formation have been deposited in a lagoonal to estuarine environment and contain many fossil fish, flora and rudists, typical reef-building organisms of the Cretaceous.

The formation rests on top of the Santiago and San Ricardo Formations, and is overlain by the Campanian to Maastrichtian Ocozocoautla Formation.

Description 
The Sierra Madre Formation was first formally described by Gutiérrez Gil in 1956, but previously reported by other authors (Böse, 1905; Ver Wiebe, 1925; Müllerried, 1936; Imlay, 1944). The formation was studied in more detail and subdivided in several members (Chubb, 1959; Sánchez-Montes de Oca, 1969; Zavala-Moreno, 1971; Castro-Mora et al., 1975; Michaud, 1987; Quezada-Muñetón, 1987).

The top is covered unconformably by the Campanian to Maastrichtian Ocozocoautla Formation.

The depositional environment is described as an environment with high oxygen concentration and high primary productivity with sporadic influence of strong waves and/or currents in a brackish marginal marine environment; shallow lagoon or estuary.

Fossil content 
The formation preserves fossil fish, flora and marine invertebrates dating back to the Cretaceous period, ranging from the Aptian of the Early Cretaceous to the Cenomanian of the Late Cretaceous.

Similar fossils have been found in the Tlayúa Formation, of Albian age in Puebla, southern Mexico, as fishes, one odonate nymph and isopods.

Fish 
Fossils of Archaeochiapasa mardoqueoi and Pepemkay, a Cenomanian prehistoric ray-finned fish, were found in the formation. Other prehistoric fish fossils, found in quarries near the Municipality of Ocozocoautla de Espinosa, include Macrosemiids (Macrosemiocotzus species), Clupeomorphs (Triplomystus applegatei and Paraclupea-like species), and Alepisauriformes (Saurorhamphus and Enchodus species).

Rudists 
These rudists are reported from the formation:

 Caprinuloidea sp.
 Coalcomana sp.
 Kimbleia sp.
 Radiolites sp.
 Requienia sp.
 Sauvagesia sp.
 Texicaprina sp.
 Toucasia sp.

Flora 
The following flora were found in the formation:

 Ephedra
 Arecipites sp.
 Osmunda sp.
 Selaginella sp.
 Sphagnum sp.
 Bombacaceae indet.
 Lauraceae indet.
 Moraceae indet.

See also 
 
 List of fossiliferous stratigraphic units in Mexico
 Cedar Mountain Formation, contemporaneous fossiliferous formation in eastern Utah
 Escucha Formation, contemporaneous fossiliferous formation in the Dominican Republic
 Santana Group, contemporaneous fossiliferous group in northeastern Brazil containing the Lagerstätten
 Crato Formation
 Romualdo Formation
 Kem Kem Beds, contemporaneous fossiliferous formation in Morocco
 Burmese amber, contemporaneous paleoecology from Myanmar

References

Bibliography

Further reading 
 P. García Barrera. 2006. Rudists of Mexico: Historical Aspects and Selected Areas of Research. in F. J. Vega, T. G. Nyborg et al., eds., Studies on Mexican Paleontology, Vol. 24 of Topics in Geobiology, Springer, Dordrecht, Netherlands 61-78

Geologic formations of Mexico
Cretaceous Mexico
Upper Cretaceous Series of North America
Cenomanian Stage
Lower Cretaceous Series of North America
Albian Stage
Aptian Stage
Limestone formations
Dolomite formations
Lagoonal deposits
Fossiliferous stratigraphic units of North America
Paleontology in Mexico
Formations
Natural history of Chiapas